The Way We Were is a 1973 film starring Barbra Streisand and Robert Redford.

The Way We Were may also refer to:

Music

Albums
 The Way We Were: Original Soundtrack Recording, from the 1974 film
 The Way We Were (Barbra Streisand album), 1974
 The Way We Were (Andy Williams album), 1974
 The Way We Were (A House album), 2002
 The Way We Were: Live in Concert, by Etta Jones, with Houston Person; recorded 2000, released 2011

Songs
 "The Way We Were" (song), from the 1974 film, by Barbra Streisand
 "The Way We Were", by Will Young from Lexicon
 "The Way We Were", by XX Teens from Welcome to Goon Island

Television

Series
 The Way We Were (2014 TV series) (16個夏天), a Taiwanese series
 The Way We Were (2018 TV series) (归去来), a Chinese series

Episodes
 "The Way We Were" (The Bill Engvall Show)
 "The Way We Were" (The Facts of Life)
 "The Way We Were" (Family Ties)
 "The Way We Were" (The Fresh Prince of Bel-Air)
 "The Way We Were" (Girlfriends)
 "The Way We Were" (The O.C.)
 "The Way We Were" (The Royal)
 "The Way We Were" (That's So Raven)

Other uses 
 The Way We Were, an exhibition at the Wigan Pier in Wigan, Lancashire, England

See also 
 "The Way We Was", a 1991 episode of The Simpsons
 "The Way We Weren't", a 2004 episode of The Simpsons
 "The Way We Weren't" (Farscape), an episode of Farscape